New Hampshire Route 9 (abbreviated NH 9 and also known as the Franklin Pierce Highway) is a  state highway located in southern New Hampshire. It runs across the state from west to east and is a multi-state route with Vermont and Maine, part of 1920s-era New England Interstate Route 9.

The western terminus of NH 9 is at the Vermont state line in Chesterfield, where it connects to Vermont Route 9. Its eastern terminus is at the Maine state line in Somersworth, where it connects to Maine State Route 9.

Two large sections of NH 9, totaling , are cosigned with U.S. Route 202.  By combined mileage of the two sections, US 202 and NH 9 share the longest concurrency in New Hampshire.

Route description

Chesterfield to Concord

NH 9 begins in the west where VT 9 crosses the Connecticut River from Brattleboro, Vermont, into Chesterfield, New Hampshire on the United States Navy Seabees Bridge. The highway meanders its way through the large town (by area) en route to Keene, home of Keene State College. NH 9 enters the southern part of the city and intersects with the triplex of NH 10, NH 12, and NH 101, the latter of which has its western terminus here. NH 9 joins NH 10 and NH 12, bypassing downtown Keene to the west. After about a mile, NH 12 splits off to the northwest. Two miles later, NH 10 follows suit and NH 9 continues northeast, crossing through parts of Roxbury, Sullivan, and Nelson en route to Stoddard, where NH 9 intersects with NH 123. The two routes overlap for about a mile before NH 123 splits northwest, while NH 9 continues east. The highway passes along the northern edge of Antrim, intersecting and overlapping with NH 31. The two routes cross into the town of Hillsborough, where NH 31 splits off to the northwest and NH 9 becomes a semi-limited access highway (not quite up to super-two standards due to a number of at-grade intersections). One mile (1.6 km) to the east, NH 9 interchanges with US 202 and the two routes form the first of two lengthy concurrencies. US 202 and NH 9 bypass downtown Hillsborough to the north, as well as the neighboring town of Henniker, before entering Hopkinton. US 202 and NH 9 intersect NH 127 near the town line and continue east to one of two partial interchanges with I-89. The first interchange allows the following movements: US 202/NH 9 east to I-89 south, US 202/NH 9 west to I-89 north, I-89 north to US 202/NH 9 west, and I-89 south to both directions of US 202/NH 9. The highway continues into town, intersecting the southern terminus of NH 103 (a secondary highway paralleling I-89 north) before intersecting I-89 again, with southbound-only access to the Interstate highway. US 202 and NH 9 enter the city of Concord from the west and roughly parallel I-89 until reaching downtown. The two highways intersect the northern terminus of NH 13 before meeting US 3 downtown. US 202 and NH 9 turn north onto US 3 for about six blocks before NH 9 turns east onto Loudon Road, intersecting with I-93 (US 202 continues along US 3 to meet I-393 just to the north). NH 9 crosses underneath I-393 and enters the extreme northern tip of Pembroke.

Pembroke to Somersworth
Upon crossing into Pembroke, I-393 ends and merges with NH 9. US 202 rejoins NH 9 at this point, as does US 4, and the triplex of routes immediately crosses into Chichester, followed by Epsom. The highway intersects with NH 28 at the Epsom Traffic Circle and continues eastward. Just feet before crossing into Northwood, NH 107 intersects with US 4, US 202, and NH 9, forming a four-route concurrency. After two miles, NH 107 splits off to the north while US 4, US 202, and NH 9 continue into Northwood. In the eastern part of town, the highway reaches an intersection with NH 43. At this intersection, US 202 and NH 9 split off US 4 towards Rochester, with US 4 continuing southeast towards Durham and Portsmouth. US 202 and NH 9 meet the western terminus of NH 202A (an alternate of US 202 toward Rochester), nick the extreme northwestern corner of Nottingham, and enter Barrington. In Barrington, US 202 and NH 9 split again; US 202 heads northeast towards Rochester, and NH 9 turns southeast, crossing NH 125 en route to Dover. NH 9 enters Dover from the southwest and intersects the northern terminus of NH 155, then turns northeast and immediately interchanges with the Spaulding Turnpike (NH 16) at exit 8. NH 9 continues into the heart of Dover as Silver Street and meets up with NH 108 (Central Avenue).  NH 4 has its western terminus here.  NH 9 and NH 108 traverse downtown Dover, with NH 4 splitting off towards Rollinsford along the way. The two routes split at the end of Central Avenue, north of downtown.  Access to the Spaulding Turnpike exit 9 is available at this intersection   NH 9 turns northeast and enters Somersworth. The road continues towards the Salmon Falls River at the heart of the city and intersects NH 236.  NH 9 and NH 236 are cosigned along High and Market Streets in the downtown area.  NH 9 crosses the Salmon Falls River into Berwick, Maine, and becomes Maine State Route 9.  NH 236 ends at the border and is not directly connected to Maine State Route 236, but the two are linked via SR 9.

History

New England Interstate Routes 

Modern NH 9 was originally conceived as part of the New England Interstate system. The New England Interstate system declined in the mid-1920s in favor of the modern U.S. Numbered Highways and all of NEI 9 was redesignated as state highways bearing the number 9.

 

The section of NH 9 cosigned with US 202 between Hillsborough and Henniker is part of former New England Interstate Route 32.  NEI 32 was superseded in the mid-1930s by US 202 west of Henniker, and by sections of modern NH 114 and NH 103 north of Henniker.  The section between Henniker and Hopkinton is concurrent with part of former New England Interstate Route 32A.  NEI 32A, as originally designated, split from NEI 32 in Henniker (where modern NH 114 interchanges with US 202/NH 9) east along modern US 202/NH 9 to Hopkinton, then northwest along modern NH 103 to Mount Sunapee, then north along modern NH 103B to terminate at NEI 11 (modern NH 11).

Junction list

Suffixed routes

New Hampshire Route 9A

New Hampshire Route 9A is a  secondary road in Chesterfield, not far from the Vermont border, and is the lone auxiliary route of NH 9.  Signed east-west, the short highway terminates at NH 9 at both ends and provides access to Spofford Lake.

See also

 List of state highways in New Hampshire

References

External links

 New Hampshire State Route 9 on Flickr
 New Hampshire State Route 9A on Flickr
 Old New Hampshire State Route 9 on Flickr

009
Transportation in Cheshire County, New Hampshire
Transportation in Hillsborough County, New Hampshire
Transportation in Merrimack County, New Hampshire
Transportation in Rockingham County, New Hampshire
Transportation in Strafford County, New Hampshire
Keene, New Hampshire
Concord, New Hampshire
Dover, New Hampshire